Shouvik Debkumar Ghosh (born 5 November 1992) is an Indian footballer who plays as a left back for TRAU FC in the I-League.

Career

Pailan Arrows
Ghosh joined Arrows in 2010 when it was formed as AIFF XI. After making only two appearances in his first season for Pailan Arrows, he established himself as a regular player next season playing in 16 matches in 2011–12.

On 10 October 2012, Ghosh was named the captain of the outfit.

Mohun Bagan
After spending three years with Pailan Arrows it was confirmed on 22 October 2013 that Ghosh had signed for Mohun Bagan.
 
He made his debut in the I-League on 23 October 2013 against Salgaocar at the Salt Lake Stadium in which he came on as a substitute for Ravinder Singh in the 46th minute as Mohun Bagan won the match 2-1.

Delhi Dynamos (loan)
Shouvik represented Delhi Dynamos FC in the 2014 Indian Super League and was a regular for them at left back.

NorthEast United
On 25 May 2016, ISL club NorthEast United FC signed Ghosh from Mohun Bagan for the third edition of Hero ISL. He netted his first goal for the club on 26 November during the extra times costing a draw against Chennaiyan FC.

Jamshedpur
On 23 July 2017, Ghosh was selected in the 8th round of the 2017–18 ISL Players Draft by Jamshedpur for the 2017–18 Indian Super League season. He made his debut for the club during the first ever match on 18 November 2017 against NorthEast United. He started the match and played 80 minutes as Jamshedpur drew 0–0.

International
Ghosh has played for the India U19 during the AFC U-19 qualifying campaigns. Ghosh made his India U23 debut against Lebanon U23 on 23 June 2012 during the qualifiers for the 2013 AFC U-22 Asian Cup, playing the whole 90 minutes as India won 5–2.

Career statistics

Club
Statistics accurate as of 26 March 2015

References

Indian footballers
1992 births
Living people
I-League players
Footballers from West Bengal
Indian Arrows players
Mohun Bagan AC players
Odisha FC players
NorthEast United FC players
Jamshedpur FC players
India youth international footballers
People from Hooghly district
Association football fullbacks
TRAU FC players
Mumbai City FC players